PFCB may refer to:

 PFCB, the International Civil Aviation Organization airport code for Chenega Bay Airport, Alaska
 PFCB, the NASDAQ code for P. F. Chang's China Bistro, an American restaurant chain